Alimuddin is the name of:

 Alimuddin Ahmad (1884–1920), Bengali activist and revolutionary
 Alimuddin (cricketer) (1930–2012), Pakistani cricketer
 Alimuddin Zumla (born 1955)
 Azim ud-Din I, also known as Alimuddin, eighteenth century Sultan of Sulu and Sabah